Edward Abraham "Bozo" Miller (June 11, 1918 – January 7, 2008) was an American restaurant owner, Gastronomical Champion of competitive eating, and a Guinness World Record holder  listed as "world's greatest trencherman."

The Guinness Book of World Records named Miller as the "world's greatest trencherman" before the eating records section of that publication was excised in 1990. The 1981 edition of Guinness claimed that Miller had been undefeated in eating contests since 1931, resulting in a fifty-year winning streak. Despite a diet consisting of up to 25,000 calories a day - reflected in his former 5' 7½", 280-300 pound physique - Miller lived to the age of 89. Miller had by then retired from competitive eating and weighed considerably less than he did during his heyday.

Miller believed he received his nickname when his father, who travelled the country with Bozo's mother in a vaudeville show, was performing as a clown. He married Janice Bidwell, a former Princess of the Pasadena Rose Bowl. She died on March 28, 2001 after many years of illness and invalidity stemming from a brain haemorrhage and through which Miller cared for her.

"Bozo" and wife Janice had three daughters together: Virginia "Cooky" Logan, Candice Blackman, and Janice "Honey" Miller who died in a car crash in the 1970s. The death of his daughter ultimately led to Miller's retirement from professional eating.

"Bozo" Miller worked as a restaurateur and then as a liquor distributor. His drinking ability was almost as impressive as his gastronomic feats. He once drank a lion under the table. Miller was an avid horse racing fan and witnessed many of the major races of the racehorse Seabiscuit.

Miller died on January 7, 2008, having struggled with diabetes and heart disease in his final years. Early obituaries gave his age as 99 and his year of birth as 1908, but according to obituaries in The Wall Street Journal, The Washington Post, The Daily Telegraph, and The Philadelphia Inquirer, Miller was born in 1918 and, according to the Wall Street Journal obituary, habitually exaggerated his age.

Eating records 
27 two-pound chickens — Trader Vic's, San Francisco, 1963
324 ravioli (first 250 in 70 minutes) — Rendezvous Room, Oakland, 1963
63 Dutch apple pies in an hour, 1961
1000 packets of potato chips

References

External links
  
  
  
  
  
 

1918 births
2008 deaths
American competitive eaters
Deaths from diabetes
Businesspeople from Oakland, California
Place of birth missing
20th-century American businesspeople